was a Japanese samurai lord who was the head of the Minamoto clan and served as Chinjufu-shōgun. Along with his son Minamoto no Yoshiie, he led the Imperial forces against rebellious forces in the north, a campaign called the Zenkunen War, which would be followed some years later by the Gosannen War. He was also the predecessor of Takeda ryu.

Biography 
His childhood name was Odaimaru (王代丸). He held the title, passed down from his father, of Chinjufu-shōgun, Commander-in-chief of the Defense of the North.

Yoriyoshi accompanied his father Minamoto no Yorinobu on his own missions to defend the Empire, quelling rebellions and disturbances. Thus he gained much of his knowledge of tactics and strategy. He fought in the Zenkunen War for twelve years starting in 1051, including the Battle of Kawasaki. In 1063, Yoriyoshi founded Tsurugaoka Hachiman-gū in Kamakura which was to become, roughly a century later, the primary shrine of the Minamoto clan when they began the Kamakura shogunate.

His son was Minamoto no Yoshiie, who "would go on to be admired by his contemporaries as the greatest warrior."

In 1065, he ordained as a Buddhist monk and received the Dharma name Shinkai (信海).

Family
 Father: Chinjufu-shōgun Minamoto no Yorinobu
 Mother: Shuri no Myobu
 Wife: daughter of Taira no Naokata
 Concubine: Takichi Muneyori's daughter
 Children:
 Minamoto no Yoshiie 
 Minamoto no Yoshitsuna 
 Minamoto no Yoshimitsu

See also
 Iwashimizu Hachimangū
 Hachiman

References

Sources
Sansom, George (1958). 'A History of Japan to 1334'. Stanford, California: Stanford University Press.

Minamoto clan
People of Heian-period Japan
Heian period Buddhist clergy
988 births
1075 deaths